The 2018–19 Wearside Football League season is the 127th in the history of Wearside Football League and the first season that the Durham & Wearside Development Division is part of the system.

Wearside Football League 
The 2018–19 season consists of 16 clubs from South Tyneside, Gateshead, Sunderland, County Durham, Teesside, Cumbria and North Yorkshire.

The following 4 clubs left the Wearside League before the season -
 Redcar - promoted to Northern League Division Two
 Cleator Moor Celtic - promoted to North West Counties Football League Division One North
 Stokesley Sports Club - resigned
 Prudhoe Town - resigned
 South Shields Res - resigned

The following 3 clubs joined the Wearside League before the season -
 Darlington RA - relegated from Northern League Division Two
 Hordon Colliery Welfare - promoted from Durham Alliance League
 West Auckland Tuns - promoted from Durham Alliance League

Position by round

Durham & Wearside Development Division 
Newly created division which will act as a feeder to the Wearside League. Many of the teams in the league moved from the Durham Alliance Combination League when it was closed in 2018.

Position by round

References

2018-19
11